Kenneth Bower (18 March 1926 – August 2002) was an English footballer who scored 45 goals from 102 appearances in the Football League playing for Third Division North clubs Darlington and Rotherham United in the years following the Second World War. He played as a centre forward.

References

1926 births
2002 deaths
Footballers from Huddersfield
English footballers
Association football forwards
Darlington F.C. players
Rotherham United F.C. players
English Football League players